Orthophytum glabrum is a plant species in the genus Orthophytum. This species is native to Brazil.

Cultivars
 Orthophytum 'Cabernet'

References

BSI Cultivar Registry Retrieved 11 October 2009

glabrum
Flora of Brazil